The London Monarchs  played in the independent Canadian Baseball League that existed for half of the summer season of 2003 before folding. Located in the city of London, Ontario, the team featured a variety of international ballplayers from Canada, the Dominican Republic, Japan and the United States. 

The Monarchs led the east division with a 20–13 record before league officials pulled the plug on the season at the half-way point. They played out of Labatt Park.

The Monarchs' field manager was former Major League outfielder Willie Wilson.  The team went through two general managers, the first being former pro umpire Kirk Sawyers.  Shortly after the regular season began, Sawyers and several other prominent league employees, including ex-MLB star Ron LeFlore, resigned en masse.

The Monarchs hosted the inaugural CBL game.  This was the league's only regular season sellout, as more than 5,000 people saw London defeat Montreal in the nationally televised game.  The Monarchs averaged over 700 fans per game for the remainder of the shortened season.

Defunct minor league baseball teams
Sports teams in London, Ontario
Defunct baseball teams in Canada
Baseball teams in Ontario
2003 establishments in Ontario
2003 disestablishments in Ontario
Baseball teams established in 2003
Defunct independent baseball league teams
Baseball teams disestablished in 2003